Beverly Lunsford (January 5, 1945 - May 22, 2019) was an American actress best known as the female character, Shirley Fletcher, on the situation comedy television series, Leave it to Beaver.

Early life
Lunsford was born in Atlanta, Georgia.

Career
Lunsford's early career encompassed several stage performances as well as television and movies. She first appeared at the age of 12 in the 1957 Broadway production of The Rope Dancers, starring Siobhán McKenna and Art Carney. Lunsford's big-screen work started soon after. She appeared in several anthology dramas, then progressed to guest-starring roles on television series such as National Velvet, My Three Sons, and Leave It To Beaver. She temporarily played the part of Amy Ames Britton Kincaid on the CBS soap opera The Secret Storm, during which she filled in for the main star, Jada Rowland. She had previously played a role on The Edge of Night

Lunsford's starring role came in 1961 when she played in Roger Corman's topical drama The Intruder. The film dealt with race relations in the American South in the wake of the Brown vs. Board of Education Supreme Court ruling in 1954.

In 1963, Lunsford was cast in Herbert L. Strock's horror film The Crawling Hand. Lunsford made her last screen appearance in 1969, although she still attended various public celebrity-oriented events until her death in 2019.

Filmography

Television

References

External links
 Find A Grave

1945 births
2019 deaths
Actresses from Atlanta
People from Los Angeles
21st-century American women